The Battle of Maguelone was a minor naval action that occurred in late October 1809, during the Peninsular War, between the escort of a French convoy, comprising three ships of the line and two frigates, and a six-ship squadron of the Royal Navy. In a running battle, the French covered the retreat of the convoy and attempted to escape by sailing in shallow waters close to the shore of Maguelone. After two of the ships of the line ran aground, their crews evacuated them and scuttled them by fire after removing valuable equipment, including the artillery. The remaining ship and frigates made good their escape to Toulon. A British cutting-out party attacked the convoy in Baie des Roses on 1 November, destroying most of it and capturing three ships.

Context 
On 21 October 1809, a squadron of the French Navy under Rear-Admiral François-André Baudin left Toulon, escorting a convoy bound for Barcelona. On 23 October, off Cape Saint Sebastian, the squadron detected five sails in the west. With a light wind from the east, Baudin ordered the convoy to seek shelter in Baie des Roses, and had his forces sail to the open sea. By noon, 14 British ships were in sight. In the night, the weather deteriorated and the ships had to reduce sail, an operation made difficult and longer than usual by the lack of training of the crew. In the morning of 24 October, the squadron found itself near the coast, and by 07:30, Baudin ordered his ships to anchor. With 16 metres under keel, he signaled his intention to set sail soon and seek refuge off Sète.

Collingwood, having had word of the French attempt to resupply their forces in Barcelona, had left Cape Sicié with 15 ships of the line and five frigates to ambush the convoy off Cape Saint Sebastian. Two frigates were also posted off Toulon to watch the movements of the French ships.

Battle 
On 25 October 1809, the French squadron left their anchorage of Baie des Roses and sailed to the west, close to shore, with light winds from the east. The British resumed their chase, catching up on the French, as the wind was stronger further off at sea. Baudin ordered Pauline to run to Sète to warn of the incoming British squadron and have coastal defences manned and ready. At 11:30, the French ships started to touch bottom, and Baudin gave freedom of manoeuver to his captains. Borée managed to reach deeped waters, but Robuste and Lion ran aground.

Robuste and Lion rested on a bed of rock and hard sand, Lion east of Robuste, both ships out of range of the British. Meanwhile, Pauline and Borée came in range and exchanged a few shots with HMS Tigre and Leviathan. Captain Senez, of Borée, planned to anchor off Sète, but Ensign Vallat, captain of the aviso Provençale, which was patrolling the area, offered to pilot Borée into the harbour. The manœuver succeeded, putting Borée out of reach of the British squadron. Pauline mirrored the actions of Borée and also entered the port.

With the sea growing heavier, the British stayed off Baudin's ships, but Robuste and Lion were sustaining increasing damage and leaking water. It soon became obvious that the ships could not be raised, and would have to be abandoned and scuttled. General Frégeville, commander of the local national guard, requisitioned boats and mobilised national guards from Montpellier to assist in rescue operations. In the early morning of the 26th, Frégeville went on Robuste to confer with Baudin and offer assistance, and they decided to set a battery on the shore and light fires, as to deter an assault by British boats. They started evacuating the crew and stripping the ships from all useful equipment. In the afternoon, the British ships closed in and launched boats; the French fired on them with four- and six-pounder field guns that Frégeville had had installed aft of Robuste, and launched their own boats to engage the British party. At 18:30, Baudin signaled that he was about to set his ships on fire. Robuste and Lion exploded in the night.

Some of the British boats took heavy casualties in the clash. Still, they captured three merchantmen, and set 10 ships on fire, including Lamproie. The aviso Victoire, under Garibou, resisted three boarding attempts before being destroyed.

Aftermath 
Amélie, having broken her bowsprit, escaped to Marseille and returned to Toulon on 3 November. Borée and Pauline arrived at Toulon on the 19th.

In January 1813 prize money was awarded to the British vessels that took part in the action for the capture of the ships of war Grondeur and Normande, and of the transports Dragon and Indien. A court declared  a joint captor. Head money was also paid for Grondeur and Normande and for the destruction of Lamproie and Victoire. In 1847 the Admiralty awarded the Naval General Service Medal with clasp "1 Nov. Boat Service 1809" to all surviving claimants from the action.

Order of battle

Sources and references 
 Notes

 References

 External links
  Bataille navale au large de Maguelone 
 6 Anglais 4 Français

 Bibliography
 
 
 
 
 

Naval battles involving the United Kingdom
Naval battles of the Napoleonic Wars
1809 in France
October 1809 events
Conflicts in 1809